Events in the year 1975 in Cyprus.

Incumbents 

 President: Makarios III
 President of the Parliament: Glafcos Clerides

Events 
Ongoing – Cyprus dispute

 12 March – U.N. Security Council Resolution 367 was adopted after receiving a complaint from the government of the country, the Council again called upon all States to respect the sovereignty, independence, territorial integrity and non-alignment of the Republic of Cyprus.

Deaths

References 

 
1970s in Cyprus
Years of the 21st century in Cyprus
Cyprus
Cyprus
Cyprus